Elena Catherine Parent (born December 27, 1975) is an American politician and attorney. A member of the Democratic Party, she serves in the Georgia State Senate and previously served in the Georgia House of Representatives.

Personal life
Parent was born in Washington, D.C. She received both her bachelor's degree and Juris Doctor from the University of Virginia. She has two children with her husband, Briley. She was an associate attorney with Sutherland Asbill & Brennan LLP from 2002 to 2008.

Political career

In 2010, Parent was elected to serve in the Georgia House of Representatives, representing District 81 from 2011 to 2013. She did not run for reelection in 2013 after her seat was combined with the district of Scott Holcomb after the state's redistricting process.

When Jason Carter decided to run for governor in 2014, Parent ran for the open seat in District 42, which includes portions of central and north DeKalb County. She defeated attorney Kyle Williams in the Democratic primary. She won reelection on November 3, 2020, for a fourth term in the Georgia Senate beginning in 2021.

References

External links
 Profile at the Georgia State Senate
 Campaign website

1975 births
Living people
Democratic Party Georgia (U.S. state) state senators
Women state legislators in Georgia (U.S. state)
People from DeKalb County, Georgia
Democratic Party members of the Georgia House of Representatives
Place of birth missing (living people)
21st-century American politicians
21st-century American women politicians
Georgia (U.S. state) lawyers
University of Virginia alumni